Tabriz University of Medical Sciences (TUOMS) (Persian: دانشگاه علوم پزشکی تبریز, Danushgah-e 'lum-e Pezeshki-ye Tebriz) is public medical sciences university located in Tabriz, East Azarbaijan Province, Iran. It is ranked as one of Iran's top medical school, with more than 5000 students.

The University consists of eleven faculties: Medicine, Pharmacy, Dentistry, Paramedical Sciences, Health, Nutrition and Food Sciences, Rehabilitation, Nursing & Midwifery, Health management and medical informatics, Advanced Medical Sciences and Traditional Medicine.  The school offers professional degrees in Medicine (M.D.), Dentistry (D.D.S.), Pharmacy (Pharm.D.); Bachelor's, Master's, and Doctor of Philosophy(Ph.D.) in various other medically related subjects. The school also offers technical courses in pursuit of Associate's degrees and certification in medically related fields.

In addition, TUMS operates over 10 teaching hospitals and is a major medical care provider in East Azarbaijan Province and the surrounding provinces.

History
The university was first established by the autonomous Azerbaijan People's Government under Jafar Pishevari on June 12, 1946, as the University of Azerbaijan with faculties in Medicine, Agriculture and Pedagogy.  However, the university closed in November with the collapse of the autonomous government. It was re-opened on October 30, 1947, which is now officially set as its inauguration date. The university was called the University of Azarabadegan prior to the Islamic Revolution of 1979 and renamed the University of Tabriz afterwards. In 1985, the Iranian Ministry of Health, Treatment and Medical Education took over the departments and faculties in the medical sciences and the Tabriz University of Medical Sciences became an independent institution.

Chancellors
Chancellors of Tabriz University of Medical Sciences since its detachment from University of Tabriz:

 Dr. Seyyed Kazem Madayen, MD, Urologist
 Dr. Hossein Sadeghi Shoja, Physiologist
 Dr. Masoud Pezeshkian, MD, Cardiac Surgeon
 Dr. Mohammad Nouri, PhD, Biochemist
 Dr. Ahmad Reza Jodati, MD, Cardiac Surgeon
 Dr. Ahmad Ali Khalili, MD, Cardiac Surgeon
 Dr. Alireza Yaghoubi, MD, Cardiac Surgeon
 Dr. Mohammad Hossein Somi, MD, Gastroenterologist

Faculties
Tabriz University of Medical Sciences consists of 10 faculties which train students for undergraduate, graduate and postgraduate degrees. Being the largest faculty of the university, the Faculty of Medicine operates university-affiliated hospital and outpatient clinics together with departments of Basic Sciences which reside in the faculty. Basic Sciences departments of the Tabriz Faculty of Medicine include: Anatomy, Physiology, Biochemistry & Genetics, Microbiology, Immunology & Parasitology, Medical Physics and Community Medicine. Clinical departments are located in the university affiliated hospitals and include: Internal Medicine (other than Cardiology), Cardiology, Neurology, Infectious Diseases, Surgery, Cardiothoracic Surgery, Urologic Surgery, Orthopedic Surgery, Dermatology, Otolaryngology, Ophthalmology, Radiology, Psychiatry, Pediatrics, Gynecology & Obstetrics, Anesthesiology and Emergency Medicine.

Tabriz Faculty of Pharmacy (Also known as Tabriz Pharmacy School) is ranked as the second most outstanding pharmacy school in the country. In addition to training general pharmacy doctors (Pharmacists), it provides Ph.D. degrees in the fields of Pharmaceutics, Pharmacology & Toxicology, Pharmacognosy, Pharmaceutical Biotechnology and Pharmaceutical Chemistry.

Tabriz University of Medical Sciences has 11 faculties:
 Faculty of Medicine
 Faculty of Pharmacy
 Faculty of Dentistry
 Faculty of Health 
 Faculty of Nutrition
 Faculty of Nursery & Midwifery
 Faculty of Health management and medical informatics
 Faculty of Para medicine
 Faculty of Rehabilitation
 Faculty Of Advanced Medical Sciences 
 Traditional Medicine
And 
 Maragheh Faculty of Nursery & Midwifery
 Sarab Faculty of Medical Sciences

Affiliated hospitals
Tabriz University of Medical Sciences and Medical Services operates over 10 hospitals. Imam Khomein Hospital was the main educational hospital of the university before 2007. Afterwards Imam Reza hospital took over the principal clinical departments of the university and most sections of Imam Khomeini hospital was transferred to the newly organized "Imam Reza" hospital. Currently, Imam Reza hospital is now the main educational hospital of the university and also serves as the referral hospital of the city and East Azerbaijan Province. Imam Reza hospital has taken over the main clinical departments of the university including: Internal Medicine (other than Cardiology and Hematology/Oncology), Neurology, Infectious Diseases, Surgery, Urology, Neurosurgery, Otolaryngology, Radiology and Emergency Medicine.

Shahid Madani Hospital serves as the heart center of TUMS (Madani Heart Center) and consists of cardiology and cardiac surgery wards, heart emergency care section and Coronary Care Unit (CCU). Madanai Heart Center was a part of Imam Khomeini Hospital before 1994 until it became an independent institution for cardiac surgery. Madani Heart Center serves as the main hospital for Angiography, Percutaneous Coronary Intervention (PCI), Coronary Artery Bypass Graft (CABG) and many other heart operations and inpatient & outpatient managements.

Imam Reza Hospital does not administer all the clinical departments and wards of TUMS; other hospitals serve as referral centers for these. These include Dermatology (Sina Hospital), Hematology/Oncology (Shahid Ghazi Medical Center), Gynecology & Obstetrics (Alzahra and Taleghani Hospitals), Orthopedic Surgery (Shohada Hospital), Physical Medicine & Rehabilitation (Shohada Hospital), Ophthalmology (Nikoukari Hospital), Psychiatry (Razi Hospital) and Pediatrics (Children's Hospital).

Bababaghi Leprosarium, which is also affiliated to TUMS, is one of the main centers of leprosy in Iran. This center has been serving leprosy patients since its establishment before the Islamic Revolution.

Hospitals affiliated to Tabriz University of Medical Sciences:

 Imam Reza Hospital
 Shahid Madani (Imam Khomeini) Hospital
 Children's Hospital (Koudakan Hospital)
 Sina Hospital
 Razi Hospital
 Alzahra Hospital
 Shohada Hospital
 Bababaghi Hospital
 Taleghani Hospital
 Nikoukari Hospital
 Alavi Hospital
 Shahid Ghazi Medical Center

Medical sciences research at TBZMED
Tabriz University of Medical Science is responsible for more than 10 research centers where academics and students conduct research in medical science subjects. Research Vice-Chancellor Office is the administrator of biomedical research and manages most of  research centers except Drug Applied Research Center (DARC) and Tuberculosis & Lung Research Center which are independent research centers working under direct supervision of Ministry of Health & Medical Education. Drug Applied Research Center is one of outstanding biomedical research centers throughout the country and produces considerable number of original articles annually.

Student Research Committee is another institution which is supervised by research Vice-Chancellor Office and administers student research projects, workshops and scientific travels.

Research centers of TBZMED:

 Neurosciences Research Center (NSRC)
 Immunology Research Center (IRC)
 Drug Applied Research Center (DARC)
 Tuberculosis and Lung Research Center
 Pharmaceutical Nanotechnology Research Center (RCPN)
 Liver and Gastrointestinal Diseases Research Center
 Nutritional Research Center
 Cardiovascular Diseases Research Center
 Research Center for Infectious Diseases and Tropical Medicine
 Clinical Research Center of Alzahra Gynecology and Obstetrics Hospital
 Biotechnology Research Center
 Hematology and Oncology Research Center
 National Public Health Management Center (NPMC)
 Incubator Center for Pharmaceutical Technology
 Student Research Committee

See also
Higher education in Iran
List of universities in Iran
University of Tabriz
Tehran University of Medical Sciences

References

External links
Official website

 
Medical schools in Iran
Educational institutions established in 1947
1947 establishments in Iran
Buildings and structures in Tabriz